The 1995 Grand Prix motorcycle racing season was the 47th F.I.M. Road Racing World Championship season.

Season summary
Honda's Mick Doohan captured his second consecutive 500cc crown in 1995. Suzuki's Daryl Beattie had an early season points lead but crashed and injured himself in practice at Assen. Luca Cadalora again won two races for Yamaha but failed to show any consistency. Kevin Schwantz retired after the third race of the season with his numerous injuries finally taking their toll.

Max Biaggi also won his second consecutive 250 championship for Aprilia with his eight victories second only to Mike Hailwood's 10 victories in 1966. Haruchika Aoki dominated the 125cc championship, winning the title for Honda with seven wins.

1995 Grand Prix season calendar
The following Grands Prix were scheduled to take place in 1995:

†† = Saturday race

Calendar changes
 The German Grand Prix moved from the Hockenheimring to the Nürburgring.
 The Austrian Grand Prix was taken off the calendar because the Salzburgring (the venue which was used) was deemed too dangerous for racing.
 The Rio Grand Prix was added to the calendar as a replacement for the Austrian Grand Prix.
 The United States Grand Prix was scheduled to be held on 6 August, but was removed from the calendar due to financial difficulties.

Participants

500cc participants

250cc participants

125cc participants

Results and standings

Grands Prix

†† = Saturday race

500cc riders' standings
Scoring system
Points are awarded to the top fifteen finishers. A rider has to finish the race to earn points.

250cc riders' standings

Scoring system
Points are awarded to the top fifteen finishers. A rider has to finish the race to earn points.

125cc riders' standings

Scoring system
Points are awarded to the top fifteen finishers. A rider has to finish the race to earn points.

† Half-points awarded in Malaysia, as the riders did not complete the sufficient distance for full points.

References
 Büla, Maurice & Schertenleib, Jean-Claude (2001). Continental Circus 1949-2000. Chronosports S.A. 

Grand Prix motorcycle racing seasons
Grand Prix motorcycle racing season